Strove is a village in Tuscany, central Italy, administratively a frazione of the comune of Monteriggioni, province of Siena. At the time of the 2001 census its population was 84.

Strove is about 23 km from Siena and 6 km from Monteriggioni.

References 

Frazioni of Monteriggioni